is one of the  or geisha districts in Kyoto.  means "Shrine River", referring to the nickname of the Kamo River just south of Shijō.

Miyagawa-chō has three interconnected rings as its trademark, symbolizing the unity of the shrine/temples, the townspeople, and the teahouses.

What is now Miyagawa-chō was a place where entertainers gathered. Kabuki was performed in many small theaters on the banks of the Kamo River. Some of the teahouses were even boats that operated in the river. As kabuki was just then developing into a mass entertainment spectacle as known today, the area was very popular and Miyagawa-chō quickly grew into a full town of teahouses. The association with kabuki has gone, but the Minami-za kabuki theatre of Kyoto still stands on its historical spot on the east bank of the Kamo River. Today, Miyagawa-chō has its own , or theater where geisha dances are performed.

See also
 Other geisha districts in Kyoto
 Gion, another district located just north of Miyagawachō
 Pontochō, another district on west side of Kamo river and just north

External links
Kyo Odori Annual Dance Festival in Miyagawacho
Debuted Maiko in Miyagawacho

References 

Geography of Kyoto